Marcus Hutton (born in Limavady, Northern Ireland) is an actor and voice over artist who trained at the Guildhall School of Music and Drama. Hutton played Nathan Cuddington in Channel 4's soap opera Brookside from 1998 to 2000. He has also voiced hundreds of radio and TV commercials in the UK and around the world. He has guest starred in the Doctor Who audio dramas The Church and the Crown (2002) and The Kingmaker (2006).

In 2008/2009, Hutton toured with Leslie Grantham in Murder with Love.

Filmography

External links

Voice over website

1964 births
People from Limavady
Male voice actors from Northern Ireland
Living people
Male soap opera actors from Northern Ireland
Male actors from County Londonderry